Hippocrepidea is a genus of fungi within the Gomphillaceae family. This is a monotypic genus, containing the single species Hippocrepidea nigra.

References

Ostropales
Lichen genera
Ostropales genera
Taxa named by Emmanuël Sérusiaux